Globulina is a genus of fungi in the class Dothideomycetes. The relationship of this taxon to other taxa within the class is unknown (incertae sedis).

Species
Globulina aberrans
Globulina antennariae
Globulina astragali
Globulina carpinacea
Globulina cejpi
Globulina corcontica
Globulina dura
Globulina duriuscula
Globulina erisyphoides
Globulina glabra
Globulina ingae
Globulina laricina
Globulina leporina
Globulina lupini
Globulina martialis
Globulina microspora
Globulina piniseda
Globulina quercina
Globulina ruborum
Globulina sarothamni
Globulina saxifragae
Globulina trichocarpa
Globulina urticae

See also
List of Dothideomycetes genera incertae sedis

References

Dothideomycetes enigmatic taxa
Dothideomycetes genera